Bangaram is an atoll in the Union Territory of Lakshadweep, India.

Geography

Bangaram atoll is connected to the reef of Agatti  through a shallow submarine ridge.

Islands
There is a long brackish pond in the center of the island fringed by screwpine and coconut palms.
It is a small sand cay.
It is located  East-Northeast of Bangaram island, at the edge of the lagoon basin .
Parali 1, Parali 2 and Parali 3 are three small islets at the eastern fringe of the reef . The Islets have a total land surface of  Parali 1 Was washed away in 2017

Demographics
Bangaram Island, the main island in the atoll, has a small population of 10. Bangaram Island Resort was located on the east coast of this island.
Thinnakara, has a construction camp (~30) for the new resort being built on its west coast.

Administration
The island belongs to the township of Agatti Island of Kavaratti Tehsil.

Tourism
The Bangaram Island Beach Resort opened to tourism in 1974, but the lack of commercial flights made access difficult. Tourism took off after the Agatti Aerodrome on the nearby Agatti island was commissioned and regular commercial flights from Kochi were established. The resort had 60 cottages. Current alcohol regulations in Lakshadweep allow consumption of alcoholic drinks only on Bangaram Atoll.

The new Thinnakara is owned by locals from Agatti. It will offer numerous adventure activities, including scuba diving, snorkelling, deep sea fishing beside white sand beaches, a calm lagoon and a sparkling, clear coral reef.

Flora and fauna
The Atoll is popular for its serene setting. Numerous species of tropical birds are found on the island.

Image gallery

References 

Islands of Lakshadweep
Atolls of India
Underwater diving sites in India
Cities and towns in Lakshadweep district
Populated places in India
Islands of India